Cydia splendana, the chestnut tortrix, is a moth of the family Tortricidae. It is found in Europe. It is also known as the acorn moth, but this can also refer to Blastobasis glandulella from North America, which belongs to the more primitive family Blastobasidae.

The wingspan is 12–16 mm. The moth flies from May to September depending on the location.

The larvae feed on oak and sweet chestnut, and perhaps also Juglans species. The larvae develop mostly in mature chestnut fruits.

References

External links
 Lepidoptera of Belgium
 Microlepidoptera.nl 
 UK Moths

Grapholitini
Moths described in 1799
Tortricidae of Europe